Sheykh Heydar may refer to:

Sheykh Heydar, Kurdistan
Sheykh Heydar, Lorestan